Manslaughter is the fifth studio album by American heavy metal band Body Count. The album was released on June 10, 2014, by Sumerian Records. It is the first album to feature new rhythm guitarist Juan of the Dead and new drummer Ill Will. The album also features the return of sampler Sean E Sean, who rejoined the group in 2008.

Background
On December 9, 2012, Ice-T announced on Twitter that Body Count would begin production on a fifth studio album in January 2013. The following day, Ice-T revealed that Body Count has signed with Sumerian Records. Ice-T suggested that the album was going to be titled Rise! or Manslaughter.

On May 10, 2013, Ice-T announced that work on the fifth studio album had begun and that it would be entitled Manslaughter. The album was released on June 10, 2014. On May 19, 2014, the album's first single "Talk Shit, Get Shot" was released. On May 21, 2014, the music video was released for "Talk Shit, Get Shot".

Critical response

The album received generally positive reviews, and received a score of 72/100 from Metacritic, based on six reviews.

Gregory Heaney of AllMusic gave the album three out of five stars, saying "At this stage, Body Count haven't changed much, and really aren't likely to, which means that if you were on board with their earlier work, then Manslaughter has even more rap-influenced metal to fuel your rage. However, if you weren't sold on these guys in the first place, this album isn't likely to change your mind." While Craig Hogan of All About The Rock said "This is quite possibly the best album BC have ever released." Phil Freeman of Alternative Press gave the album four out of five stars, saying "Manslaughter is a ferocious, heavy record that proves once again that Ice-T and company are undeniable metal contenders, far more than a pop-cultural footnote." Jon Hadusek of Consequence of Sound gave the album a B−, saying "Lyrically and musically, Manslaughter is easily Body Count's most inspired work since their self-titled debut, because it sounds like a reconciliation of all the misconceptions the band had to deal with in the past. It's a statement of intent this time: They want to be heard, no matter who gets offended or pissed off. If you can't take it, don't listen. If you can, then stop talking shit and enjoy the ride."

Track listing

Personnel
Ice-T – lead vocals
Ernie C – lead guitar
Juan of the Dead – rhythm guitar
Vincent Price – bass guitar
Ill Will – drums
Sean E Sean – sampler, backing vocals

Guest musician
Jamey Jasta – guest vocals on "Pop Bubble"

Charts

References

2014 albums
Body Count (band) albums
Sumerian Records albums
Albums produced by Will Putney